Hajjiabad (also Romanized as Ḩājjīābād and Hajīābād; also known as Feyẕābād) is a village in Abezhdan Rural District, Abezhdan District, Andika County, Khuzestan Province, Iran. At the 2006 census, its population was 35, in 4 families.

References 

Populated places in Andika County